Yılmaz Gündüz (2 January 1929 – 1997) was a Turkish basketball player. He competed in the men's tournament at the 1952 Summer Olympics.

References

1929 births
1997 deaths
Turkish men's basketball players
Olympic basketball players of Turkey
Basketball players at the 1952 Summer Olympics
People from Tarsus, Mersin